Meriden Mall (formerly Meriden Square and Westfield Meriden) is a shopping mall located in Meriden, Connecticut. At almost 900,000 square feet, Meriden is Connecticut's seventh largest mall, housing over 140 shops. This mall currently maintains the traditional divisions Boscov's, Dick's Sporting Goods, in addition to TJ Maxx, while featuring several prominent traditional specialty retailers Charlotte Russe, Bath and Body Works, Forever 21 Red, Foot Locker, Torrid, and Windsor.

History
The facility, originally built and owned by The May Department Stores Company opened in 1971.  Its original architecture was a two-level, dumbbell shaped shopping center with two anchor stores, the Connecticut-based G. Fox, which was also owned by The May Company chain,  and JCPenney. Original tenants were Radio Shack, Spencer Gifts, Hickory Farms, Barricini Candy, Record World, Waldenbooks, CVS,  Singer sewing machine store, a piano and organ store,  a travel agency, a liquor store, and a tobacco store. The only restaurant in the main part of the mall was a Friendly's Ice Cream parlor and restaurant, though both JCPenney and G. Fox had restaurants located inside of their stores. The mall also featured an incline ramp-escalator in the center court.

A 1993 renovation added a two-level wing anchored by a new Sears department store and also included a new food court, creating a T-shaped floor plan.  Also in 1993, G. Fox parent, May Company acquired Boston based Filene's and merged the two department stores together under the Filene's name. The Meriden G. Fox store changed its name to Filene's.

The Westfield Group  acquired the mall in 1997.

The mall was expanded again in an ambitious renovation announced in 1997. The renovation saw an extra floor area of  added to the center, as well as an additional 30 stores, creating a cross-shaped floor plan. The new anchor, built opposite Sears, was upscale department store Lord & Taylor, the centerpiece of the $38 million revitalization and expansion plan. In addition to its new anchor,  a multistory parking garage was also built beside Sears on the end of the mall facing Lewis Avenue. The renovation was completed and officially opened in 1999.

In 2005, Lord & Taylor shuttered this location after being repositioned. Westfield quickly moved to replace the division with Dick's Sporting Goods, which moved right into the original Lord & Taylor outpost.

During 2006, Filene's announced that all locations will each transition into Macy's separately, including this location.

In 2014, it was announced that Boscov's will replace JCPenney, both expanding and completely remodeling the structure. The location is Boscov's first in Connecticut and in the entire New England region. The store opened in November 2015.
 
On November 8, 2018, it was announced that Sears would shutter as part of an ongoing effort to phase out of their traditional brick-and-mortar divisions.

On January 6, 2020, it was announced Macy's, whom maintains several much larger additional outposts in this region, as part of a strategy to focus on their highest achieving locations that they would be leaving this regional shopping concourse.

On September 21, 2021, it was announced that Best Buy would shutter this brick-and-mortar location along with several other additional outposts across this nation in an effort to maximize profit margins due to the COVID-19 pandemic.

Numerous additional replacement tenants for each space are each reportedly in the midst of early on discussions.

On October 4, 2021, Yale New Haven Health bought the original Macy's, which is set to raze the building and develop it into a prominent retail health center.

See also
Westfield Group

References

Shopping malls in Connecticut
Buildings and structures in Meriden, Connecticut
Shopping malls established in 1971
Shopping malls in the New York metropolitan area
1971 establishments in Connecticut
Namdar Realty Group